Resugga Green is a hamlet in Cornwall, England, UK. It is half a mile north of Penwithick Stents near St Austell.

References

Hamlets in Cornwall